Suchoprion is a dubious genus of phytosaurian archosaur known from poor remains from the Late Triassic of North America. It was once thought to be a theropod dinosaur until 2013, when it was reclassified as a phytosaur.

Edward Drinker Cope named the genus Suchoprion in 1877 on the basis of a single species: S. cyphodon (the type), known only from weathered teeth (AMNH FR 2331A). The second species, S. sulcidens, was named in 1878. Both species were found in Wheatley's Copper Mines, Emigsville in Pennsylvania.

References

External links
George Olshevsky's Dinosaur Genera List
The Paleobiology Database

Phytosaurs
Prehistoric reptile genera
Late Triassic reptiles of North America
Triassic geology of Pennsylvania
Paleontology in Pennsylvania
Nomina dubia
Fossil taxa described in 1877
Taxa named by Edward Drinker Cope